Rekola is bicycle sharing system in the Czech Republic and Slovakia. It started in Prague in 2013 as a small project of Vít Ježek. As of 2020, it is operating in six Czech cities, Bratislava, the capital of Slovakia and in the Finnish city of Vaasa. The company is operating more than 2000 bikes, most of them are located in Prague. Daily ridership in 2018 was 4,700 people. The pink bikes of Rekola do not have any docks, which makes the system five times cheaper than traditional dock system. The bikes can be unlocked through an official app. User unlocks the bikes manually through the code which is given from the app.

Besides classical bikes, Rekola is also providing shared ebikes, kick scooters, skateboards and paddleboards.

History

COVID-19 pandemic
During the COVID-19 pandemic and after declaration of state of emergency in March 2020, the company offered unlimited number of free 30 minute rides to anybody in all cities where it operates in the Czech Republic. This offer was enabled by sponsorship from Czech companies Rohlik.cz and Prusa Research. The goal was to enable an access to transport with lower risk of virus transmission than public transport.

Locations

Czech Republic 
Rekola currently operates bike sharing systems in 6 Czech cities as of 2020. It operated in 11 cities in the Czech Republic in 2019. The list also shows approximate number of bikes in each city.

Outside of the Czech Republic

References

External links 

Bicycle sharing companies
2013 establishments in the Czech Republic
Community bicycle programs
Cycling in the Czech Republic
Bicycle sharing in the Czech Republic